Łubnice  is a village in Staszów County, Świętokrzyskie Voivodeship, in south-central Poland. It is the seat of the gmina (administrative district) called Gmina Łubnice.

The village has a population of  347.

Demography 
According to the 2002 Poland census, there were 345 people residing in Łubnice village, of whom 50.1% were male and 49.9% were female. In the village, the population was spread out, with 25.8% under the age of 18, 35.4% from 18 to 44, 20% from 45 to 64, and 18.8% who were 65 years of age or older.
 Figure 1. Population pyramid of village in 2002 — by age group and sex

References

Villages in Staszów County
Kielce Governorate
Kielce Voivodeship (1919–1939)